Hanging Heaton is a village in West Yorkshire, England. Partly in both Batley and Dewsbury, it is an historic village mentioned in the Domesday Book under the name 'Etun'. The prefix 'Hanging' refers to a steep hillside hanging above lower ground, while 'Heaton' means 'High Farm', meaning the village was once a hillside farmstead.

With housing dating from the 16th century to the present day, it is a varied community with a successful cricket club, golf club, two churches, a pub and a community group. Hanging Heaton is also home to both Hanging Heaton CE (VC) J & I School and Mill Lane J I & EY School.

Hanging Heaton was the birthplace of physiologist Robert Edwards, who was the pioneer of in vitro fertilisation (IVF).

See also
Listed buildings in Dewsbury

References

External links

Villages in West Yorkshire
Geography of Batley
Geography of Dewsbury
Heavy Woollen District